KL FM is a Malay language-regional radio station operated by Radio Televisyen Malaysia. Its main radio station is in the International Broadcasting Centre, Angkasapuri.

Etymology 
The station was formerly known as Radio Malaysia Kuala Lumpur (RMKL) and before that as Radio 3 Kuala Lumpur and Radio Malaysia Ibu Kota (RMIK).

References

External links 
 
 

Radio stations in Malaysia
Mass media in Kuala Lumpur
Malay-language radio stations
Radio Televisyen Malaysia